Smooth Up in Ya: The Best of the Bulletboys is the second greatest hits album by heavy metal band BulletBoys.

Track listing

Personnel
Anthony Focx - Mastering, Mixing

References

BulletBoys albums
2006 compilation albums
Cleopatra Records compilation albums